The 2009 Sam Houston State Bearkats football team represented Sam Houston State University as a member of the Southland Conference during the 2009 NCAA Division I FCS football season. Led by fifth-year head coach Todd Whitten, the Bearkats compiled an overall record of 5–6 with a mark of 3–4 in conference play, and finished fifth in the Southland.

Schedule

References

Sam Houston State
Sam Houston Bearkats football seasons
Sam Houston State Bearkats football